Shari Sebbens is an Aboriginal Australian actress and stage director, known for her debut film role in The Sapphires (2012), as well as many stage and television performances. After a two-year stint as resident director of the Sydney Theatre Company (STC), in 2023 she will be directing productions by STC and Griffin in Sydney, as well as Melbourne Theatre Company and Malthouse Theatre in Melbourne.

Early life and education
Sebbens, one of six children, was born and raised in Darwin, Northern Territory, Australia. Her father is a former long-distance coach driver from Sydney of English descent and her mother, Annarella, an Aboriginal education worker from Broome, Western Australia is of Jabirr Jabirr and Bardi heritage. Sebbens refers to Australian music composer and playwright Jimmy Chi as her uncle, although they are not related by blood. She is the cousin of writer and film director Mitch Torres.

As a child, Sebbens wanted to become a palaeontologist or an astronaut but at the age of thirteen she saw Indigenous actress (and future The Sapphires co-star) Deborah Mailman in the film Radiance (1998) and was inspired to pursue acting.

Sebbens graduated from Darwin High School in 2001 and after two and a half years at Nhulunbuy, at age 19, was chosen to participate in "SPARK", a theatre mentorship programme established by the Australia Council for the Arts. At 20 she was accepted into the Western Australian Academy of Performing Arts (WAAPA) where she completed a one-year course in Aboriginal Theatre. Upon completing her studies at WAAPA, Sebbens successfully auditioned for a place at the National Institute of Dramatic Art (NIDA) in Sydney, where she studied acting full-time for three years, graduating in 2009.

Acting and directing

Screen
Sebbens played Anna in a short film called Violet in 2010. By May 2012 Sebbens landed a role in Redfern Now, a television series about "six inner city households whose lives are changed by a seemingly insignificant incident". 

Sebbens secured a role in The Sapphires (2012), a film based on the stage show of the same name, written by Tony Briggs. It was directed by Wayne Blair and also starred Deborah Mailman, Jessica Mauboy, and Miranda Tapsell (who also co-wrote the script). Sebbens played the role of Kay McCrae, one of four Indigenous Australian singers "who travel from a mission in Victoria to Vietnam to sing for American troops". The cast attended the film's premiere at the 65th Annual Cannes Film Festival in Cannes, France, on 20 May 2012.

, Sebbens has two acting projects lined up for the future, both on screen.

Theatre
In 2012 Sebbens played Miri Smith and Currah in A Hoax with Griffin; in 2014,  Dawn in Lobby Hero at Tap Gallery; and in 2015, Mae in Radiance at Belvoir. In 2017, she played Charlotte Gibbons in STC's production of Nakkiah Lui's play Black is the New White in Sydney (with Miranda Tapsell stepping into her role when the show toured to Adelaide).

In 2019 she took the role of Julia Hersey in a production of Our Town by Black Swan State Theatre Company in Perth, and in the same year played matriarchal character Carina in Meyne Wyatt's City of Gold, her last role on stage for at least another three years, in a play she later directed, in 2021.

In 2021 Sebbens was appointed as one of the STC's resident directors. She was assistant director to Wesley Enoch on the STC's production of Appropriate, staged in March–April 2021.

Also in 2021 she directed the STC's touring production of Enoch's The 7 Stages of Grieving, featuring Elaine Crombie. The staging was originally scheduled for 2020, but, interrupted by the COVID-19 pandemic in Australia, was postponed until mid-2021. It was scheduled to be staged in Sydney, Adelaide and Canberra, with  a new epilogue that introduced a note of activism, with Crombie, Sebbens and assistant director Ian Michael calling for the audience to engage in "seven actions of healing".

Sebbens is dramaturg on STC's 2022 production of Shakespeare's The Tempest, starring Richard Roxburgh and directed by Kip Williams.

in 2023 she will be directing productions by STC and the Griffin Theatre Company in Sydney, as well as Melbourne Theatre Company and Malthouse in Melbourne.

Other activities
Sebbens was a judge for the Patrick White Playwrights Award at STC in 2018.

After being appointed STC's resident director, she hosted the TV series The Whole Table,  a co-production between STC and NITV, which aired in January–February 2021. Her co-panellists were playwright Wesley Enoch, actor/writer/director Nakkiah Lui and Rhoda Roberts, and guests included Taika Waititi, Miranda Tapsell, Adam Briggs, Meyne Wyatt, Yolanda Bonnell and Kwame Kwei-Armah.

Recognition
2012: Nominated, Sydney Theatre Award for Best Newcomer, for A Hoax
2013: Winner, Logie Award for Most Outstanding New Talent at the Logie Awards of 2013, for Redfern Now
2019–2020: Richard Wherrett Fellow

Filmography

Films

Television

Theatre (selection)

References

Further reading

External links

21st-century Australian actresses
Australian film actresses
Australian people of English descent
Australian television actresses
Australian theatre directors
Indigenous Australian actresses
Living people
Logie Award winners
National Institute of Dramatic Art alumni
Year of birth missing (living people)